Charles John Naughton (21 April 1886 – 11 February 1976) was a Scottish comedian.

Naughton was born in Glasgow. He was a member of The Crazy Gang, and part of a double act, Naughton and Gold with fellow Glaswegian Jimmy Gold. In 1955, he starred in the first Guinness television commercial, playing the zoo-keeper with a German seal. He died in London.

His daughter, Sally, was a pre-war actress on stage and with British-Gaumont films, appearing under the name Sally Stewart. As a 23-year-old she married in an Edinburgh solicitor's office in January 1939 to Peter Croft, 21-year-old British film actor, son of Ann Croft, actress.  Sally's daughter, Naughton's granddaughter, Sally-Anne Stapleford is a five-time British champion in figure skating in the ladies event and won the silver medal at the 1965 European Figure Skating Championships.

Selected filmography
 My Lucky Star (1933)
 Highland Fling (1936)
 O-Kay for Sound (1937)
 Alf's Button Afloat (1938)

References

External links
 

1886 births
1976 deaths
Male actors from Glasgow
Male actors from London
Scottish male television actors
Scottish male comedians
British male comedy actors
20th-century British comedians